is a 2017 Japanese two-part drama film based on arthouse screenwriter Shūji Terayama's one and only full length novel, Aa Koya, published in 1966. Directed by Yoshiyuki Kishi, it stars Masaki Suda and Yang Ik-june. It made its world premiere in A Window on Asian Cinema at the 22nd Busan International Film Festival in 2017.

Plot 
Two "losers" meet by chance when they decide to join a rundown boxing gym by half-blind trainer Horiguchi (Yūsuke Santamaria). Ex-convict Shinji (Masaki Suda), whose father's suicide death impacts his mental health and outward aggressiveness, has just been released from a juvenile detention centre and is out to take revenge on Yuji Yamamoto (Yūki Yamada) who betrayed him and has since become a boxer. Kenji (Yang Ik-june), a mild-mannered half-Korean-half-Japanese barber, is extremely shy and stutters due to a traumatic past with his abusive father. They form an unlikely friendship as they journey their way to become professional boxers and a way back into an unforgiving society.

Cast 
 Masaki Suda as Shinji Sawamura
 Yang Ik-june as Kenji
 Yūsuke Santamaria as Horiguchi
 Yūki Yamada as Yuji Yamamoto
 Akari Kinoshita as Yoshiko Sone
 Anna Konno as Keiko Nishiguchi
 Kou Maehara as Keizo Kawasaki
 Tae Kimura as Kyoko Kimizuka

Awards and nominations

References

External links 
  
 Wilderness Part 1 at JFDB
 Wilderness Part 2 at JFDB
 
 

2017 films
2010s sports films
2010s Japanese-language films
Japanese boxing films
2010s Japanese films